"1st of tha Month" is the first single by Bone Thugs-n-Harmony from their album E. 1999 Eternal.

It was certified Gold by the RIAA for sales of 500,000 copies. It peaked at No. 14 on the Billboard Hot 100, becoming their first top twenty single, and later was nominated for a Grammy Award in 1996.

Background
The title is a reference to when welfare checks are paid out. There are several remixes of the song, including one by DJ Premier.

Track listing
"1st of tha Month" (radio edit)
"1st of tha Month" (radio edit)
"1st of tha Month" (album version)
"1st of tha Month" (instrumental)
"1st of tha Month" (a cappella)
"Die Die Die" (album version)
Verse 1 - Krayzie Bone
Verse 2 - Bizzy Bone
Verse 3 - Wish Bone
Verse 4 - Layzie Bone

Official versions
 "1st of tha Month" (album version; original version)
 "1st of tha Month" (a cappella)
 "1st of tha Month" (instrumental)
 "1st of tha Month" (The Kruder and Dorfmeister remix) - 6:15
 "1st of tha Month" (radio edit)
 "1st of tha Month" (radio edit with Tré)

Samples
The song contains a sample from the Chapter 8 and Anita Baker song  "I Just Want to Be Your Girl" and an interpolation of the "wake up, wake up, wake up, wake up, get up, get up, get up, get up" chant from Marvin Gaye's "Sexual Healing".

Charts

Weekly charts

Year-end charts

Certifications

In popular culture
 Chris Rock references the song in his 1997 album Roll With the New on his "Niggas vs. Black People" routine, calling the song a "welfare carol".
 The track is also featured at the beginning of Girl Talk's "Steady Shock" on his mashup-style album "All Day."
 American rapper the Game sampled the song for his song "Celebration".
 The song is featured in the re-release version of the video game Grand Theft Auto V as part of the West Coast Classics radio station.
American rapper Playboi Carti interpolated the song on his track, "Sky", from his sophomore album Whole Lotta Red. Specifically on these lines, "Wake up (Wake up, wake up, woah); It's the first of the month (Slatt, slatt, slatt, slatt)".

References

1995 singles
Bone Thugs-n-Harmony songs
Welfare in the United States
Gangsta rap songs
1995 songs
Songs written by Layzie Bone
Songs written by Bizzy Bone
Songs written by Wish Bone
Songs written by Krayzie Bone
Songs written by DJ U-Neek